"Never Lose Your Sense of Wonder" is the debut single by English rock band Yeti. The title track and b-side Midnight Flight are included on the singles-compilation Yume!, released only in Japan in 2007 and is included on their debut album The Legend Of Yeti Gonzales. It reached #36 on the UK Singles Chart.

Track listings
CD
 "Never Lose Your Sense Of Wonder" (Hassall) 2:50
 "Working For The Industry" (Hassall) 2:22
 "Midnight Flight" (Underwood) 3:01

7"
 "Never Lose Your Sense Of Wonder" 2:50
 "Working For The Industry" 2:22

Download
 "Never Lose Your Sense Of Wonder" 2:50
 "Working For The Industry" 2:22
 "Midnight Flight" 3:01

Charts

References

2005 singles
Yeti (band) songs
2005 songs